1097 Vicia, provisional designation , is an asteroid from the central regions of the asteroid belt, approximately 23 kilometers in diameter. Discovered by Karl Reinmuth at the Heidelberg Observatory in 1928, the asteroid was later named after the flowering plant Vicia, commonly known as vetches.

Discovery 

Vicia was discovered by German astronomer Karl Reinmuth at the Heidelberg-Königstuhl State Observatory in southwest Germany on 11 August 1928. On 15 and 22 August, the asteroid was independently discovered by Soviet astronomer Pelageya Shajn at Simeiz Observatory on the Crimean peninsula, and by English astronomer Harry Edwin Wood at the Johannesburg Observatory in South Africa, respectively. However, the Minor Planet Center only recognizes the first discoverer.

The body's observation arc begins at Heidelberg in August 1928, six nights after its official discovery observation.

Orbit and classification 

Vicia is a non-family asteroid from the main belt's background population. It orbits the Sun in the central main belt at a distance of 1.9–3.4 AU once every 4 years and 4 months (1,570 days). Its orbit has an eccentricity of 0.29 and an inclination of 2° with respect to the ecliptic.

Physical characteristics 

Vicia spectral type has not been determined. Asteroids in the central main belt with a semi-major axis between 2.6 and 2.7 AU, are located in a transitional region where both stony and carbonaceous asteroids are frequent and generic assumptions are difficult.

Rotation period 

In November 2010, a rotational lightcurve of Vicia was obtained from photometric observations by Gordon Gartrelle at the University of North Dakota and at the Badlands Observatory in North Dakota, United States. Analysis of the fragmentary lightcurve gave a rotation period of 26.5 hours with a brightness variation of 0.08 magnitude, indicative for a spherical rather than irregular and elongated shape. As of 2017, however, no other lightcurve has been obtained and Vicias rotation period has not yet been secured.

Diameter and albedo 

According to the surveys carried out by the Japanese Akari satellite and the NEOWISE mission of NASA's Wide-field Infrared Survey Explorer, Vicia measures between 19.63 and 26.55 kilometers in diameter and its surface has an albedo between 0.031 and 0.060.

The Collaborative Asteroid Lightcurve Link derives an albedo of 0.0695 and a diameter of 21.02 kilometers based on an absolute magnitude of 11.9.

Naming 

This minor planet was named after the flowering plant Vicia, member of the Fabaceae (legume family). It is commonly known as vetches. The official naming citation was mentioned in The Names of the Minor Planets by Paul Herget in 1955.

Reinmuth's flowers 

Due to his many discoveries, Karl Reinmuth submitted a large list of 66 newly named asteroids in the early 1930s. This list also contained a sequence of 28 asteroids, starting with 1054 Forsytia, that were all named after plants, in particular flowering plants (also see list of minor planets named after animals and plants).

Notes

References

External links 
 Asteroid Lightcurve Database (LCDB), query form (info )
 Dictionary of Minor Planet Names, Google books
 Asteroids and comets rotation curves, CdR – Observatoire de Genève, Raoul Behrend
 Discovery Circumstances: Numbered Minor Planets (1)-(5000) – Minor Planet Center
 
 

001097
Discoveries by Karl Wilhelm Reinmuth
Named minor planets
19280811